Woodland Community College is a public community college in Woodland, California. It is a part of the Yuba Community College District and is accredited by the Accrediting Commission for Community and Junior Colleges.

History
In the fall of 1975, Woodland offered courses in an outreach program. In 1981 the California Postsecondary Education Commission labeled Woodland as an official education center. In 1990, Woodland Center (now Woodland Community College) relocated to its current  parcel of land. In 1999, Yuba Community College District notified its intent for Woodland Center to become a self-sufficient community college, the same year that a Child Development center was opened on campus. The next year the district received the approval from the State Chancellor's office to begin Woodland Center's process of being a comprehensive college.

In 2006, Woodland Community College began the accreditation process through the Western Association of Schools and Colleges, completing the process in June 2008 with the notification of initial accreditation.

References

External links
Official website

California Community Colleges
Universities and colleges in Yolo County, California
Buildings and structures in Woodland, California
Schools accredited by the Western Association of Schools and Colleges
1975 establishments in California
Educational institutions established in 1975